Mahoro may refer to:

 Mahoro, a character in InuYasha: The Secret of the Cursed Mask video game
 Mahoro Andou, the female protagonist in the Mahoromatic series